The claimed flying aces of the Vietnam War, pilots who shot down five or more enemy aircraft, include 19 North Vietnamese pilots (six MiG-17 and 13 MiG-21 pilots), and five Americans.

The American aces flew as members of two-man crews on F-4 Phantoms, reflecting the emergence of air-to-air missiles as the primary weapons of aerial combat. Two were pilots, two Air Force weapon systems officers, and two Navy radar intercept officer; both awarded an aerial-kill claim for each enemy aircraft shot-down.

One source reported that the North Vietnamese claimed to have shot down 218 U.S. manned aircraft in air to air combat in Vietnam, of those kills, 85 are not supported by U.S. records, while another 37 were attributed by the U.S. to surface-to-air missiles and anti-aircraft fire. Another source claims that the U.S. attributed losses to surface-to-air missiles and anti-aircraft fire because it was considered "less embarrassing". Estimates of North Vietnamese losses range from 131, as documented in North Vietnamese records; to 195, as claimed by U.S. records.

William A. Sayers writing in 2019 asserted that North Vietnam only had three aces in the war including Phạm Thanh Ngân, with the other "aces" being creations of North Vietnamese propaganda that included claimed "kills" on days where no U.S. losses occurred, crediting VPAF pilots with kills that had actually been achieved by surface to air missile or antiaircraft artillery units and shootdowns of drones. He also stated that there were no MiG-17 aces.

See also 
 List of United States aerial victories of the Vietnam War

References

External links
 Toperczer, Istvan, MiG-21 Units of the Vietnam War, Osprey Combat Aircraft #29, 2008; 
 Michel III, Marshall L, Clashes, Air Combat over North Vietnam 1965-1972, Naval Institute Press, 1997; 
 

Flying aces
V